Ratnottama Sengupta (born January 27, 1955) is an Indian film journalist, festival curator/organiser and author. She is a recipient of the National Film Award, and has served on several international film juries. She is the daughter of scriptwriter Nabendu Ghosh,

Member of film jury
 54th National Film Awards
Kautik International Student Film Festival

Author/editor
Editor
That Bird Called Happiness
Alternate Lyricism

Author
Krishna's Cosmos: The Creativity of an Artist, Sculptor & Teacher
A Life in Veil - Suchitra Sen

See also
 Film Critics Circle of India

References

External links
 Member, Film Critics Circle of India
 Books on Amazon India

Living people
1955 births
National Film Award (India) winners